Elia Maria González-Álvarez y López-Chicheri, also known as Lilí Álvarez (9 May 1905 – 8 July 1998), was a Spanish multi-sport competitor, an international tennis champion, an author, feminist and a journalist.

Life

She was born at the Hotel Flora in Rome, Italy, during a stay by her affluent Spanish parents. She was raised in Switzerland and from an early age began competing in a variety of sports. At age eleven, she won her first ice skating competition, and then at age 16, she won the St. Moritz ice skating championship. She won her first tennis tournament at age fourteen. An all-around sportsperson, Álvarez was an alpine skier, equestrian, and an auto racer who won the Campeonato de Cataluña de Automovilismo at age 19.

Álvarez was a pioneer in women's tennis in Spain and was her country's most dominant player during the 1920s. Between 1926 and 1928, she reached three consecutive singles finals at Wimbledon. According to American Helen Wills Moody, who defeated Álvarez twice in Wimbledon singles finals, Álvarez' game was an "unusually daring one". She also competed at the 1924 Summer Olympics.

In 1929, Álvarez teamed up with the Dutch player Kea Bouman to win the women's doubles title at the French Championships. The following year, Álvarez won the singles title at the Italian Championships, an accomplishment that was not repeated by another female Spaniard for 63 years until Conchita Martínez won the Italian Open in 1993. Álvarez and Bill Tilden were the runners-up in the mixed doubles competition at the 1927 French Championships.

In 1927, Álvarez authored a book in English published in London under the title Modern Lawn Tennis.

In 1931, she shocked the staid tennis world by playing at Wimbledon in a divided tennis skirt specially made by designer Elsa Schiaparelli that was the forerunner of shorts (pictured). That year, Álvarez began reporting on the political events in Spain for the British newspaper the Daily Mail.

According to Wallis Myers of The Daily Telegraph and the Daily Mail, Álvarez was ranked in the world top 10 from 1926 through 1928 and in 1930 and 1931, reaching a career high of World No. 2 in those rankings in 1927 and 1928.

In 1934, Álvarez married Jean de Gaillard de la Valdène, the Count of Valdene, a French aristocrat and diplomat, and from 1936 she played for three years on the international tennis circuit as "Countess Valdène". In 1939, she lost her only child and the couple soon separated. She returned home to Spain in 1941 where she continued to be active in sports and began writing on religious and feminist topics, publishing her book Plenitud (Fullness) in 1946. She actively supported the worldwide feminist movement and in 1951 gave a speech entitled "La batalla de la feminidad" at the Hispanic-American Feminist Congress. Over the years, she wrote several more books.

When asked in 1993 about modern Spanish tennis, Álvarez favored a combative and bold playing style rather than a defensive and thus negative conception and criticized the lack of fast courts in the country, claiming that no champions can be born on clay court. She was disappointed that Sergi Bruguera didn't take part in Wimbledon after winning Roland Garros and showed enthusiasm for Conchita Martínez's Wimbledon semifinals run, noting that while she had previously shown talent it was the first time she had shown a champion's disposition.

Álvarez died in Madrid in 1998.

Grand Slam finals

Singles (3 runner-ups)

Doubles (1 title)

Mixed doubles (1 runner-up)

Grand Slam singles tournament timeline

See also 
 Performance timelines for all female tennis players who reached at least one Grand Slam final

Notes

References

External links
 

1905 births
1998 deaths
Spanish female tennis players
Spanish female racing drivers
Spanish female single skaters
Spanish feminist writers
Grand Slam (tennis) champions in women's doubles
20th-century Spanish women writers
20th-century Spanish writers
French Championships (tennis) champions
Olympic tennis players of Spain
Tennis players at the 1924 Summer Olympics
20th-century Spanish journalists
Spanish expatriates in Switzerland